Lauri Tamminen (1 December 1919 – 2 December 2010) was a Finnish athlete. He competed in the men's hammer throw at the 1948 Summer Olympics and the 1952 Summer Olympics.

References

External links
 

1919 births
2010 deaths
Athletes (track and field) at the 1948 Summer Olympics
Athletes (track and field) at the 1952 Summer Olympics
Finnish male hammer throwers
Olympic athletes of Finland
Athletes from Helsinki